Varazdeh may refer to:
 Varazdeh-e Olya
 Varazdeh-e Sofla